The 2022–23 season is the  Mohammedan SC Dhaka's 87th season in existence and 15th consecutive season in Bangladesh Premier League since the league's establishment in 2007.
 In addition to domestic league, Dhaka Mohammedan SC are participating on this season's edition of Federation Cup and Independence Cup. This season is covering period from 8 October 2022 to TBC 2023.

Current squad
Dhaka Mohammedan squad for 2022–23 season.

Transfers

In

Out

Competitions

Overall

Overview

Premier League

Results by round

Results summary

Matches

Federation Cup

Group stages

Independence Cup

Group stages

Knockout stages

Goalscorers

Source: Matches

References

Bangladeshi football club records and statistics
Mohammedan SC (Dhaka) seasons
2022 in Bangladeshi football
2023 in Bangladeshi football